The Keenan Institute is an educational organization located in Bong County, Liberia. It was founded in 1998 by the Reverend and Mrs. Prince Wreh. The name honors Steve and Jackie Keenan, two former Peace Corps teachers in Liberia.

The institute was founded to provide basic education to the many children and young adults who, as a result of the Liberian civil war, were denied a formal education. Initially a vocational school offered basic skills in carpentry, welding and business mathematics. The program grew to offer computer science, baking, hairdressing and sewing. In 2011 the ground was broken for a non-denominational elementary school. In September 2012 the Goll Farm Community School opened with grades PRE K to 6th. The school is certified and licensed by the Liberian Department of Education.
The school is located in the Jorquelle District of Bong County, adjacent to the Cuttington University campus.
In 2014 the Goll Farm School expanded to include Pre-K to Grade 8, closed for 6 months during the  Ebola crisis in Liberia, it re-opened in September 2015 with 300+ students enrolled.
Vocational training is no longer a focus, though young women are offered special classes in  hairdressing, computer training and family counseling.
Special training is offered to the community, with emphasis on hygiene and disease prevention.

The Keenan Institute has developed a relationship with the program,  "Liberia Reads". Partially funded by the NGO Friends of Liberia,  trains teachers in the art of teaching reading. In July 2016 Goll Farm School will host a month-long reading institute directed by reading experts from the United States.

On November 23, 2015, the Keenan Institute celebrated its 17th anniversary.

References

Friends of Liberia

External links
 

Bong County
Education in Liberia
Educational organizations based in Liberia
1998 establishments in Liberia
Organizations established in 1998